Mpangi Merikani (born 4 April 1967) is a retired Zaire international footballer, who played as a goalkeeper.

Club career
Born in Kinshasa, Merikani began his career with Cercle Sportif Imana and Daring Club Motema Pembe, where he would win consecutive Congolese national championships from 1983 to 1985.  He moved to play in South Africa at the age of 25, signing with Jomo Cosmos. He would spend the rest of his playing career in the South African Premier Soccer League, representing Rabali Blackpool, Real Rovers and Santos.

International career
Merikani played for Zaire at the 1988, 1992 and 1996 Africa Cup of Nations finals.

Coaching career
After he ended his playing career, Merikani became a goalkeeping coach for Jomo Cosmos in 1999.

Personal life
Menkani is the father of Jonathan Bolingi, who is also a professional footballer.

References

External links
 

1967 births
Living people
Footballers from Kinshasa
Democratic Republic of the Congo footballers
Democratic Republic of the Congo expatriate footballers
Democratic Republic of the Congo international footballers
1988 African Cup of Nations players
1992 African Cup of Nations players
1996 African Cup of Nations players
Daring Club Motema Pembe players
Jomo Cosmos F.C. players
Santos F.C. (South Africa) players
Expatriate soccer players in South Africa
Democratic Republic of the Congo expatriate sportspeople in South Africa
Association football goalkeepers